The 2012 Challenger Banque Nationale de Saguenay was a professional tennis tournament played on indoor hard courts. It was the 7th edition of the tournament and part of the 2012 ITF Women's Circuit, offering a total of $50,000 in prize money. It took place in Saguenay, Quebec, Canada between October 22 and October 28, 2012.

Singles main-draw entrants

Seeds

1 Rankings are as of October 15, 2012

Other entrants
The following players received wildcards into the singles main draw:
 Rebecca Marino
 Charlotte Petrick
 Erin Routliffe
 Carol Zhao

The following players received entry from the qualifying draw:
 Jan Abaza
 Victoria Duval
 Alexandra Mueller
 Piia Suomalainen

The following players received entry as lucky losers:
 Macall Harkins
 Françoise Abanda

Champions

Singles

 Madison Keys def.  Eugenie Bouchard, 6–4, 6–2

Doubles

 Gabriela Dabrowski /  Alla Kudryavtseva def.  Sharon Fichman /  Marie-Ève Pelletier, 6–2, 6–2

External links
Official website

Challenger Banque Nationale de Saguenay
Challenger de Saguenay
Challenger Banque Nationale de Saguenay